Jules Breach is a British sports broadcaster.

Early and personal life
Breach was born in Brighton, Sussex. She moved with her family to Mauritius until she was 5 at which point she returned to the UK and attended St Mary’s RC Primary School in Portslade, Sussex. Breach lived in Jamaica between the ages of 8 and 15. In Jamaica her passion was tennis and she would practice five or six times a week. Breach returned to Sussex and completed her education at Cardinal Newman School and then Sussex University, where she studied for a degree in Media. She is a fan of Brighton and Hove Albion F.C.

Career
Breach has presented live television in the UK on BT Sport, and Channel 4 as well as CBS Sports’ UEFA Champions League coverage. Her live broadcasts have included the Premier League and live England national football team matches in the UEFA Nations League, and live rolling coverage covering all the Saturday 3pm professional football matches across Britain on the flagship BT Sport show BT Sport Score. From 2022, Breach also presents the Saturday evening highlights package show of the English Football League on ITV, and has presented for the Premier League Productions English language team,
and Australia’s Optus Sport.

Breach has also fronted coverage of the Women’s Ashes live cricket on BT Sport in 2022. Breach regularly hosts The Football Ramble alongside Pete Donaldson, and Andy Brassell, and Kate Mason, amongst others. Breach has also guested on A Question of Sport, and presented the Premier League’s Fantasy Football Show alongside James Richardson.

References

British women journalists
British women television journalists
Women sports journalists
People from Brighton
People from Brighton and Hove
Year of birth missing (living people)
Living people